The Anatolian blind mole-rat or Nehring's blind mole-rat (Nannospalax xanthodon) is a species of rodent in the family Spalacidae.
It is found in Armenia, Georgia, and Turkey.

References

Nannospalax
Rodents of Europe
Rodents of Asia
Mammals described in 1840
Taxa named by Alexander von Nordmann
Taxonomy articles created by Polbot